Live -n- Kickin'' is a live album by country singer Billy "Crash" Craddock. It was recorded in July 2009 at the Little Nashville Opry in Nashville, Indiana. It was released in August 2009.

Track listing
 Why You Been Gone So Long
 Ruby Baby
 Easy as Pie
 Knock Three Times
 I Just Had You on My Mind
 It Ain't Gonna Rain No More
 Kaw-Liga
 Jambalaya
 Love Me #1
 I Never Go Around Mirrors
 All You Ever Do Is Bring Me Down
 Bitter They Are
 Do You Believe Me Now
 Love Me #2
 Rub It In
 An American Trilogy

2009 live albums
Billy "Crash" Craddock live albums